The Ōhura River is a river of the western North Island of New Zealand. It flows southward from its source close to the town of Ōhura, and flows into the Whanganui River.

In July 2020, the name of the river was officially gazetted as Ōhura River by the New Zealand Geographic Board.

References

Rivers of Manawatū-Whanganui
Rivers of New Zealand